In many outdoor ball sports, a goal line is a line in front of goal post and which a team attempts to advance the ball or puck towards to score a goal or points. In particular, see:

 Football pitch for usage of the term in soccer
 Goal line (gridiron football) for usage in American and Canadian football
 Goal line (ice hockey) for usage in ice hockey.
 Goal or try line, in rugby league or union football

Goal line may also refer to:
 ESPN Goal Line & Bases Loaded, a college football television show